Bless the Child is a 2003 Hong Kong film directed by Jones Ma Wah-Kon. It was released on 6 October 2003.

Plot
Boni (Pauline Suen) is a frustrated advertising executive that becomes caught in a time loop (19 March).

Cast
 Belinda Hamnett
 Hawick Lau
 Alien Sun as Boni Mok
 Tse Kwan Ho as Sean
 Wong Sum Yue
 Claire Yiu Ka Lai
 Fan Yik-Man

References

External links
 HK Cinemagic entry
 lovehkfilm entry

Hong Kong drama films
2003 films
2000s Hong Kong films